Samuel Štefánik (born 16 November 1991) is a Slovak professional footballer who plays as a midfielder for Spartak Trnava.

Club career
On September 2, 2013, he signed four-year contract with N.E.C Nijmegen. After the relegation of the club, Štefánik was able to leave the club. 

On 11 August 2014, he signed with Slovak side Slovan Bratislava.

International career
On August 14, 2013 he made his debut for Slovakia national team against Romania, entering in as a substitute in place of Marek Hamšík.

Career statistics

External links
AS Trenčín profile 

Profile at hmpsport.sk 
Voetbal International profile

References

1991 births
Living people
People from Bánovce nad Bebravou
Sportspeople from the Trenčín Region
Association football midfielders
Slovak footballers
Slovak expatriate footballers
Slovakia youth international footballers
Slovakia under-21 international footballers
Slovakia international footballers
AS Trenčín players
ŠK Slovan Bratislava players
FK Železiarne Podbrezová players
Eredivisie players
NEC Nijmegen players
Podbeskidzie Bielsko-Biała players
Bruk-Bet Termalica Nieciecza players
FC Spartak Trnava players
Ekstraklasa players
Slovak Super Liga players
2. Liga (Slovakia) players
I liga players
Expatriate footballers in the Netherlands
Expatriate footballers in Poland
Slovak expatriate sportspeople in the Netherlands
Slovak expatriate sportspeople in Poland